Alison Patricia Megarrity (9 February 1961 – 15 November 2022) was an Australian politician, who served as a member of the New South Wales Legislative Assembly representing Menai for the Labor Party between 1999 and 2011.

Megarrity's father was a railwayman and she grew up in central western New South Wales.  She was educated at Our Lady of Mercy College, Parramatta and was awarded a Bachelor of Arts by Macquarie University.  She married Robert Megarrity in 1982 and they have two sons.  She was a councillor of the City of Liverpool Council between 1994 and 1999.

On 24 September 2010, Megarrity announced her decision to not seek re-election at the 2011 State election, citing personal reasons. In 2013, Megarrity won Labor pre-selection in the Division of Hughes for the 2013 federal election, but was defeated by the sitting member Craig Kelly.

Megarrity died on 15 November 2022, at the age of 61.

See also
Politics of Australia

Notes

1961 births
2022 deaths
Members of the New South Wales Legislative Assembly
Australian Labor Party members of the Parliament of New South Wales
21st-century Australian politicians
City of Liverpool (New South Wales)
Women members of the New South Wales Legislative Assembly
Women legislative deputy speakers
Deputy and Assistant Speakers of the New South Wales Legislative Assembly
21st-century Australian women politicians